USS Redwing (AMS/MSC-200) was a  in the United States Navy.

Construction
Redwing was laid down 1 July 1953, by Tampa Marine Company, Tampa, Florida; launched 29 April 1954, as AMS-200; sponsored by Mrs. Courtney W. Campbell, wife of US Representative Campbell of Florida; and commissioned 7 January 1955.

East Coast Assignment 
Assigned to the Atlantic Fleet, Redwing arrived Charleston, South Carolina, 23 January 1955. Reclassified a coastal minesweeper, MSC-200 on 7 February, she underwent shakedown out of Key West, Florida, commencing 3 March. Returning via Mayport, Florida, to search for downed aircraft, she arrived Charleston, 20 April, and commenced minesweeping operations with various units of the Fleet.
 
Redwing arrived Panama City, Florida, 5 July, and provided services to the Mine Defense Laboratory through 9 September. She then joined  for special development operations at Key West, before returning to Charleston, 22 September. Redwing continued to operate out of Charleston, until January 1957, participating in minesweeping and amphibious training exercises as far south as Guantánamo Bay, Cuba, and Vieques, Puerto Rico.
 
She departed Charleston, 16 January, to provide services for the Naval Mine Warfare School at Yorktown, Virginia, and to operate under the Amphibious Training Command, Little Creek, Virginia. She then conducted surveys in Boston Channel, beginning 3 October, followed by exercises along the New Jersey coast in January 1958.
 
Departing New York, 25 February, for exercises as far south as Key West, she returned to Boston, Massachusetts, 21 March, and for the next year provided services for the Destroyer Development Group in Narragansett Bay.

Decommissioning 
Redwing departed Boston, 26 February 1959, en route Norfolk, Virginia, for overhaul in preparation for transfer to Spain. Decommissioned at Norfolk 16 June 1959, she was struck from the Navy List and transferred to the Spanish Navy as Sil (M-29) effective 18 June 1959.

Notes 

Citations

Bibliography 

Online resources

External links
 Dictionary of American Naval Fighting Ships
 Mine Warfare Ship Photo Archives

 

Bluebird-class minesweepers
Ships built in Tampa, Florida
1954 ships
Cold War minesweepers of the United States
Minesweepers of the Spanish Navy
Adjutant-class minesweepers